The Hippocratic Museum is a museum, on the Greek island of Kos. Its exhibits display the history of the Hippocratic Foundation of Kos, which is dedicated to transmitting knowledge about Hippocrates, as well as founding hospitals and institutes. The ancient Greek physician Hippocrates is believed to have been born there. The displays include some literature about the Hippocratic medicine.

External links 
 International Hippocratic Foundation of Kos (official website - Greek only) museum photos of
 Official municipality information website 

Biographical museums in Greece
Medical museums
Archaeological museums in the South Aegean
Kos
Medical and health organizations based in Greece